This is a list of notable ice cream brands. Ice cream is a frozen dessert, usually made from dairy products such as milk and cream, and often combined with fruits or other ingredients and flavors. However, not all frozen desserts can be called ice cream.

Ice cream brands

0-9

 3 kaveria (Finland)

A

 Aavin (India)
 Abbott's Frozen Custard (US)
 Algida (IT)
 Ample Hills (US)
 Amul (India)
 Arun Icecreams (India)
 Australian Homemade (Netherlands)

B

 Bambino Ice Cream (Poland)
 Baskin-Robbins (US)
 Ben & Jerry's (US)
 Berthillon (France)
 Blue Bell (US)
 Blue Bunny (US)
 Bonnie Doon Ice Cream (US, defunct)
 Braum's (US)
 Bresler's Ice Cream (US, defunct)
 Breyers (US)
 Brigham's Ice Cream (US)
 Bubbies (US)
 Bulla (Australia)

C

 Cargills Magic (Sri Lanka)
 Carvel (US)
 Casper's Ice Cream (US)
 Chapman's (Canada)
 Chicecream (China)
 Choctál (US)
 Cold Stone Creamery (US)
 Cold Rock Ice Creamery (Australia)
 Colonial Ice Cream (US)
 Coolhaus (US)
 Cows Creamery (Canada)
 Cream Stone (India)
 Crem Helado (Colombia)

D

 Dairy Queen (US)
 Dickie Dee (Canada, defunct)
 Diplom-Is (Norway)
 Dippin' Dots (US)
 D'Onofrio (Peru)
 Double Rainbow (US)
 Dreyer's (US)

E

 Edy's (US)
 Elephant House (Sri Lanka)
 Eskimo (Nicaragua)
 Eskimo Pie (formerly, now known as Edy's Pie) (US)

F

 Fan Milk (Ghana)
 Fenocchio (France)
 Fieldbrook Farms (US)
 Freddy's Frozen Custard & Steakburgers (US)
 Friendly's (US)
 Frikom (Serbia)
 Froneri (UK)

G

 GB Glace (Sweden)
 Gelato Italia (UK)
 Giolitti (Italy)
 Glacio (Belgium)
 Golden North (Australia)
 Good Humor (US)
 Graeter's (US)
 Grido Helado (Argentina)
 Grom (Italy)

H

 Havmor Ice Cream (India)
 Häagen-Dazs (US)
 Halo Top (US)
 Handel's Homemade Ice Cream & Yogurt (US)
 HB Ice Cream (Ireland)
 Hennig-Olsen Iskremfabrikk (Norway)
 Herrell's Ice Cream (US)
 Hershey Creamery Company (US)
 Hertog (Netherlands)
 Hjem-IS (Denmark)
 Howard Johnson's (US, defunct)

I

 Ideal Ice Cream (India)
 It's-It Ice Cream (US)

J

 J.P. Licks (US)
 Jack and Jill Ice Cream (US)
 Jeni's Splendid Ice Creams (US)
 Joe Delucci's (UK)

K

 KaleidoScoops (US)
 Kawartha Dairy Company (Canada)
 Karnataka Milk Federation (India)
 Kelly's of Cornwall (UK)
 Kibon (Brazil)
 Klondike (US)
 Kowloon Dairy (Hong Kong)
 Kyl21 (Germany)

L

 Langnese (Germany)
 Laura Secord (Canada)
 Ledo (Croatia)
 Lick Me I'm Delicious (UK)
 The Licktators (UK)
 Lovin' Scoopful (US)
 Lyons Maid (UK)

M

 Mado (Turkey)
 Magnolia (Philippines)
 Magnum (Australia)
 Maola (US)
 Marble Slab Creamery (US)
 Mauds Ice Creams (Ireland)
 Maxibon (Belgium)
 Mayfield Dairy (US)
 Meiji (Japan)
 Milma (India)
 Míša (Czech Republic)
 Morelli's (UK)
 Mother Dairy (India)
 Mövenpick Ice Cream (Switzerland)
 Mr. Green Tea Ice Cream Company (Czech Republic)
 Murphys Ice Cream (Ireland)

N

 Natural Ice Cream (India)
 Neilson Dairy (Canada)
 New Zealand Natural (New Zealand)
 Nirula's (India)

O

 OMORÉ (Pakistan)

P

 Paletería La Michoacana (Mexico)
 Paddle Pop (Australia)
 Pappagallo (Finland)
 Perry's Ice Cream (US)
 Peters Ice Cream (Australia)
 Pierre's Ice Cream Company (US)
 Pingviini (Finland)
 Polar Ice Cream (Malaysia)
 Presto Ice Cream (Philippines, defunct)
 Purity (US)

S

 Salt & Straw (US)
 Sealtest (US)
 Selecta (Philippines)
 Signature Select (US)
 Snugburys (UK)
 Solero (UK, Netherlands)
 Speelman's Ice Cream (US, defunct)
 Straus Family Creamery (US)
 Strauss (Israel)
 Streets (Australia)
 Stroh's Ice Cream (US)
 Sweet Republic Ice Cream (US)
 Swensen's (Canada)
 Swisslion Group (Serbia)

T

 Talenti (US)
 Tillamook (US)
 Tip Top (New Zealand)
 Thrifty Ice Cream (US)
 Toscanini's (US)
 Turkey Hill (US)
 Tio Rico (Venezuela)

U

 United Dairy Farmers (US)

V

 Vadilal (India)
 Valio (Finland)
 Van Leeuwen (US)

W

 Wall's (UK)
 Whitey's Ice Cream (US)
 Wibbly Wobbly Wonder

Y

 Yarnell Ice Cream Co. (US)
 Ysco (Belgium)

See also

 List of frozen dessert brands
 List of brand name food products
 List of dairy products
 List of desserts
 List of frozen food brands
 List of ice cream flavors
 List of ice cream parlor chains

References

Lists of brand name foods
Dessert-related lists